The Edgewater Cemetery (also known as Vreeland Cemetery) is a cemetery in the Bergen County, New Jersey community of Edgewater.

Site
The 1.6-acre cemetery has its entrance on River Road near the Hudson River and the Hudson River Waterfront Walkway. It is nestled between private residences and buildings that were once part of the Alcoa Edgewater Works, an Alcoa aluminum processing plant, at the foot of the Hudson Palisades.

Burials
The cemetery was created by the Vreeland family and was initially a private burial ground. It holds the graves of local heroes from the American Revolutionary War through Spanish–American War. Two slaves also are buried there, as is Go-Won-Go Mohawk, an Indian princess and actress who married a former Indian fighter and settled in Edgewater, where she died in 1924. The last burial in took place in 1982.

See also
 Gethsemane Cemetery
 Fort Lee Historic Park
 Burdett's Landing
 English Neighborhood
 Bergen County Cemeteries
 List of cemeteries in Hudson County, New Jersey

References

External links
 

Edgewater, New Jersey
Cemeteries in Bergen County, New Jersey
Pre-statehood history of New Jersey
1700s establishments in New Jersey